Yunelsis Rodríguez Báez (born 21 June 1977) is a Cuban retired footballer who played as a defender. She has been a member of the Cuba women's national team. She is currently the coach of the Turks and Caicos Islands women's national team.

International career
Rodríguez capped for Cuba at senior level during the 2012 CONCACAF Women's Olympic Qualifying Tournament.

References

1977 births
Living people
Cuban women's footballers
Cuba women's international footballers
Women's association football defenders
20th-century Cuban women